A community of practice (CoP) is a group of people who "share a concern or a passion for something they do and learn how to do it better as they interact regularly". The concept was first proposed by cognitive anthropologist Jean Lave and educational theorist Etienne Wenger in their 1991 book Situated Learning . Wenger then significantly expanded on the concept in his 1998 book Communities of Practice .

A CoP can evolve naturally because of the members' common interest in a particular domain or area, or it can be created deliberately with the goal of gaining knowledge related to a specific field. It is through the process of sharing information and experiences with the group that members learn from each other, and have an opportunity to develop personally and professionally .

CoPs can exist in physical settings, for example, a lunchroom at work, a field setting, a factory floor, or elsewhere in the environment, but members of CoPs do not have to be co-located. They form a "virtual community of practice" (VCoP)  when they collaborate online, such as within discussion boards, newsgroups, or the various chats on social media, such as #musochat centered on contemporary classical music performance . A "mobile community of practice" (MCoP)  is when members communicate with one another via mobile phones and participate in community work on the go.

Communities of practice are not new phenomena: this type of learning has existed for as long as people have been learning and sharing their experiences through storytelling. The idea is rooted in American pragmatism, especially C. S. Peirce's concept of the "community of inquiry" , but also John Dewey's principle of learning through occupation .

Overview
For Etienne Wenger, learning is central to human identity. A primary focus of Wenger's more recent work is on learning as social participation – the individual as an active participant in the practices of social communities, and in the construction of their identity through these communities . In this context, a community of practice is a group of individuals participating in communal activity, and experiencing/continuously creating their shared identity through engaging in and contributing to the practices of their communities.

The structural characteristics of a community of practice are again redefined to a domain of knowledge, a notion of community and a practice:
 Domain: A domain of knowledge creates common ground, inspires members to participate, guides their learning and gives meaning to their actions.
 Community: The notion of a community creates the social fabric for that learning.  A strong community fosters interactions and encourages a willingness to share ideas.
 Practice: While the domain provides the general area of interest for the community, the practice is the specific focus around which the community develops, shares and maintains its core of knowledge.

In many organizations, communities of practice have become an integral part of the organization structure . These communities take on knowledge stewarding tasks that were formerly covered by more formal organizational structures. In some organizations, there are both formal and informal communities of practice. There is a great deal of interest within organizations to encourage, support, and sponsor communities of practice in order to benefit from shared knowledge that may lead to higher productivity. Communities of practice are now viewed by many in the business setting as a means to capturing the tacit knowledge, or the know-how that is not so easily articulated.

An important aspect and function of communities of practice is increasing organization performance.  identify four areas of organizational performance that can be affected by communities of practice: 
 Decreasing the learning curve of new employees
 Responding more rapidly to customer needs and inquiries
 Reducing rework and preventing "reinvention of the wheel"
 Spawning new ideas for products and services

Types

Compared to functional or project teams
Collaboration constellations differ in various ways. Some are under organizational control (e.g., teams, see below) others, like CoPs, are self-organized or under the control of individuals. For examples of how these and other collaboration types vary in terms of their temporal or boundary focus and the basis of their members' relationships, see .

A project team differs from a community of practice in several significant ways. 
 A project team is driven by deliverables with shared goals, milestones and results.
 A project team meets to share and exchange information and experiences just as the community of practice does, but team membership is defined by task.
 A project team typically has designated members who remain consistent in their roles during the project.
 A project team is dissolved once its mission is accomplished.

By contrast,
 A community of practice is often organically created, with as many objectives as members of that community.
 Community membership is defined by the knowledge of the members. 
 CoP membership changes and members may take on new roles within the community as interests and needs arise.
 A community of practice can exist as long as the members believe they have something to contribute to it, or gain from it.

Versus communities of interest
In addition to the distinction between CoP and other types of organizational groupings found in the workplace, in some cases, it is useful to differentiate CoP from community of interest (CoI).

Community of interest
 A group of people interested in sharing information and discussing a particular topic that interests them.
 Members are not necessarily experts or practitioners of the topic around which the CoI has formed.
 The purpose of the CoI is to provide a place where people who share a common interest can go and exchange information, ask questions, and express their opinions about the topic.
 Membership in a CoI is not dependent upon expertise – one only needs to be interested in the subject.

Community of practice
 A CoP, in contrast, is a group of people who are active practitioners.
 CoP participation is not appropriate for non-practitioners.
 The purpose of a CoP, as discussed above, is to provide a way for practitioners to share tips and best practices, ask questions of their colleagues, and provide support for each other.
 Membership is dependent on expertise – one should have at least some recent experience performing in the role or subject area of the CoP.

Benefits

Social capital
Social capital is said to be a multi-dimensional concept, with both public and private facets (Bourdieu 1991). That is, social capital may provide value to both the individual and the group as a whole. Through informal connections that participants build in their community of practice, and in the process of sharing their expertise, learning from others, and participating in the group, members are said to be acquiring social capital – especially those members who demonstrate expertise and experience..

Knowledge management
 describe three kinds of knowledge: "knowledge as object", "knowledge embedded within individuals", and "knowledge embedded in a community". Communities of Practice have become associated with finding, sharing, transferring, and archiving knowledge, as well as making explicit "expertise", or tacit knowledge. Tacit knowledge is considered to be those valuable context-based experiences that cannot easily be captured, codified and stored , see also Hildreth & Kimble (2002).

Because knowledge management is seen "primarily as a problem of capturing, organizing, and retrieving information, evoking notions of databases, documents, query languages, and data mining" , the community of practice, collectively and individually, is considered a rich potential source of helpful information in the form of actual experiences; in other words, best practices.

Thus, for knowledge management, a community of practice is one source of content and context that if codified, documented and archived can be accessed for later use.

Factors

Individuals
Members of communities of practice are thought to be more efficient and effective conduits of information and experiences. While organizations tend to provide manuals to meet the training needs of their employees, CoPs help foster the process of storytelling among colleagues which, in turn, helps them strengthen their skills on the job .

Studies have shown that workers spend a third of their time looking for information and are five times more likely to turn to a co-worker rather than an explicit source of information (book, manual, or database) . Time is saved by conferring with members of a CoP.  Members of the community have tacit knowledge, which can be difficult to store and retrieve outside.  For example, one person can share the best way to handle a situation based on his experiences, which may enable the other person to avoid mistakes and shorten the learning curve.  In a CoP, members can openly discuss and brainstorm about a project, which can lead to new capabilities. The type of information that is shared and learned in a CoP is boundless .  clarifies the difference between tacit knowledge, or knowing how, and explicit knowledge, or knowing what. Performing optimally in a job requires being able to convert theory into practice. Communities of practice help the individual bridge the gap between knowing what and knowing how .

As members of communities of practice, individuals report increased communication with people (professionals, interested parties, hobbyists), less dependence on geographic proximity, and the generation of new knowledge . This assumes interaction and communication to take place more or less naturally and automatically when individuals come together. However, social and interpersonal factors play a role in the interaction, and research shows that some individuals willingly share or withhold knowledge and expertise from others, because their personal knowledge relates to their professional identity, position, and relationship with others.

Social presence 
Communicating with others in a community of practice involves creating social presence.  defines social presence as "the degree of salience of another person in an interaction and the consequent salience of an interpersonal relationship" (p. 38). It is believed that social presence affects how likely an individual is of participating in a CoP (especially in online environments and virtual communities of practice) . Management of a community of practice often faces many barriers that inhibit individuals from engaging in knowledge exchange. Some of the reasons for these barriers are egos and personal attacks, large overwhelming CoPs, and time constraints .

Motivation
Motivation to share knowledge is critical to success in communities of practice. Studies show that members are motivated to become active participants in a CoP when they view knowledge as meant for the public good, a moral obligation and/or as a community interest . Members of a community of practice can also be motivated to participate by using methods such as tangible returns (promotion, raises or bonuses), intangible returns (reputation, self-esteem) and community interest (exchange of practice related knowledge, interaction).

Collaboration
Collaboration is essential to ensuring that communities of practice thrive. Research has found that certain factors can indicate a higher level of collaboration in knowledge exchange in a business network . Sveiby and Simons found that more seasoned colleagues tend to foster a more collaborative culture. Additionally they noted that a higher educational level also predicts a tendency to favor collaboration.

Cultivating successful CoPs

What makes a community of practice succeed depends on the purpose and objective of the community as well as the interests and resources of the members of that community. Wenger identified seven actions that could be taken in order to cultivate communities of practice:

 Design the community to evolve naturally – Because the nature of a community of practice is dynamic, in that the interests, goals, and members are subject to change, CoP forums should be designed to support shifts in focus.
 Create opportunities for open dialog within and with outside perspectives – While the members and their knowledge are the CoP's most valuable resource, it is also beneficial to look outside of the CoP to understand the different possibilities for achieving their learning goals.
 Welcome and allow different levels of participation – Wenger identifies 3 main levels of participation. 1) The core group who participate intensely in the community through discussions and projects. This group typically takes on leadership roles in guiding the group 2) The active group who attend and participate regularly, but not to the level of the leaders. 3) The peripheral group who, while they are passive participants in the community, still learn from their level of involvement. Wenger notes the third group typically represents the majority of the community.
 Develop both public and private community spaces – While CoPs typically operate in public spaces where all members share, discuss and explore ideas, they should also offer private exchanges. Different members of the CoP could coordinate relationships among members and resources in an individualized approach based on specific needs.
 Focus on the value of the community – CoPs should create opportunities for participants to explicitly discuss the value and productivity of their participation in the group.
 Combine familiarity and excitement – CoPs should offer the expected learning opportunities as part of their structure, and opportunities for members to shape their learning experience together by brainstorming and examining the conventional and radical wisdom related to their topic.
 Find and nurture a regular rhythm for the community – CoPs should coordinate a thriving cycle of activities and events that allow for the members to regularly meet, reflect, and evolve. The rhythm, or pace, should maintain an anticipated level of engagement to sustain the vibrancy of the community, yet not be so fast-paced that it becomes unwieldy and overwhelming in its intensity .

History
Since the publication of "Situated Learning: Legitimate Peripheral Participation" , communities of practice have been the focus of attention, first as a theory of learning and later as part of the field of knowledge management. See Hildreth and Kimble (2004) for a review of how the concept has changed over the years.  offers a more critical view of the different ways in which the term communities of practice can be interpreted.

Early years
To understand how learning occurs outside the classroom while at the Institute for Research on Learning, Lave and Wenger studied how newcomers or novices to informal groups become established members of those groups . Lave and Wenger first used the term communities of practice to describe learning through practice and participation, which they named situated learning.

The structure of the community was created over time through a process of legitimate peripheral participation. Legitimation and participation together define the characteristic ways of belonging to a community whereas peripherality and participation are concerned with location and identity in the social world .

Lave and Wenger's research looked at how apprenticeships help people learn. They found that when newcomers join an established group or community, they spend some time initially observing and perhaps performing simple tasks in basic roles as they learn how the group works and how they can participate (an apprentice electrician, for example would watch and learn before actually doing any electrical work; initially taking on small simple jobs and eventually more complicated ones). Lave and Wenger described this socialization process as legitimate peripheral participation. The term "community of practice" is that group that Lave and Wenger referred to, who share a common interest and a desire to learn from and contribute to the community with their variety of experiences .

Later years
In his later work,  abandoned the concept of legitimate peripheral participation and used the idea of an inherent tension in a duality instead.  He identifies four dualities that exist in communities of practice, participation-reification, designed-emergent, identification-negotiability and local-global, although the participation-reification duality has been the focus of particular interest because of its links to knowledge management.

He describes the structure of a CoP as consisting of three interrelated terms: 'mutual engagement', 'joint enterprise' and 'shared repertoire' .

 Mutual Engagement: Firstly, through participation in the community, members establish norms and build collaborative relationships; this is termed mutual engagement.  These relationships are the ties that bind the members of the community together as a social entity.
 Joint Enterprise: Secondly, through their interactions, they create a shared understanding of what binds them together; this is termed the joint enterprise.  The joint enterprise is (re)negotiated by its members and is sometimes referred to as the 'domain' of the community.
 Shared Repertoire: Finally, as part of its practice, the community produces a set of communal resources, which is termed their shared repertoire; this is used in the pursuit of their joint enterprise and can include both literal and symbolic meanings.

Society and culture

Examples
The communities Lave and Wenger studied were naturally forming as practitioners of craft and skill-based activities met to share experiences and insights .

Lave and Wenger observed situated learning within a community of practice among Yucatán midwives, Liberian tailors, navy quartermasters and meat cutters  as well as insurance claims processors. . Other fields have made use of the concept of CoPs. Examples include education , sociolinguistics, material anthropology, medical education, second language acquisition , Parliamentary Budget Offices , health care and business sectors, and child mental health practice (AMBIT).

A famous example of a community of practice within an organization is that which developed around the Xerox customer service representatives who repaired the machines in the field . These Xerox reps began exchanging repair tips and tricks in informal meetings over breakfast or lunch. Eventually, Xerox saw the value of these interactions and created the Eureka project to allow these interactions to be shared across the global network of representatives. The Eureka database has been estimated to have saved the corporation $100 million.

Examples of large virtual CoPs include:

 Wikipedia
 Healthcare Information For All (HIFA)
 Sustainable Sanitation Alliance (SuSanA)

See also

 Adaptive management
 Discourse community
 Distributed leadership
 Duality (CoPs)
 Guild
 Knowledge transfer
 Knowledge tagging
 Landscape of practice
 Learning community
 Learning organization
 Network of practice
 Organizational learning
 Personal network
 Professional learning community
 Social environment
 Situated cognition
 Situated learning
 Teamwork
 Thought collective 
 Value network
 Value network analysis
 Virtual community of practice

References

 

 
 
 

 
 
 
 
 
  
 ; first published in 1990 as Institute for Research on Learning report 90-0013

Further reading

 
 Bourdieu, P. (1991). Language and symbolic power. Cambridge, Massachusetts: Harvard University Press.
 
 
 Gannon-Leary, P.M. & Fontainha, E. "Communities of Practice and virtual learning communities: benefits, barriers and success factors" ELearning Papers 26 Sept 2007  [Accessed Nov 2007]
 Lesser, E.L., Fontaine, M.A. & Slusher J.A., Knowledge and Communities, Butterworth-Heinemann, 2000

 
 Saint-Onge, H & Wallace, D, Leveraging Communities of Practice, Butterworth Heinemann, 2003.
 
 

1991 introductions
Learning
Practice
Educational psychology
Practice
Management